Nikita Vyacheslavovich Andreyev (born 23 March 1997) is a Russian football player that plays for FC Torpedo Vladimir.

Club career
He made his debut in the Russian Football National League for FC Shinnik Yaroslavl on 8 November 2014 in a game against FC Volga Nizhny Novgorod.

References

External links
 Profile by Russian Football National League

1997 births
Living people
People from Vladimir, Russia
Sportspeople from Vladimir Oblast
Russian footballers
Association football forwards
FC Shinnik Yaroslavl players
FC Sakhalin Yuzhno-Sakhalinsk players
Russian First League players
Russian Second League players
FC Torpedo Vladimir players